Mystery Files is a TV series broadcast on National Geographic Channel in the UK in February 2010. It aimed to shed light on some of the great mysteries of history. It is narrated by Struan Rodger.

Episodes

Season One
The first season is led by Nostradamus, Jack the Ripper, Robin Hood, Princes in the Tower, Rasputin, Billy the Kid, King Arthur, Leonardo da Vinci, Abraham Lincoln, Cleopatra, Man in the Iron Mask, Romanovs and Joan of Arc.

Season Two
The second season is led by The Birth of Christ, Hitler, Marco Polo, Alexander the Great, Taj Mahal, Isaac Newton, Saladin, Captain Kidd, Pope Joan, Sitting Bull, The Virgin Queen, Zorro and Lawrence of Arabia.

References

External links
 
 
 Mystery Files on National Geographic
 Mystery Files on Nat Geo TV

National Geographic (American TV channel) original programming